was a railway station located in Shimo-Shibetsu-chō (下士別町), Shibetsu, Kamikawa Subprefecture, Hokkaidō, and is operated by the Hokkaidō Railway Company. The station closed on 13 March 2021

Lines Serviced
JR Hokkaidō
Sōya Main Line

Adjacent stations

External links
Ekikara Time Table - JR Shimo-Shibetsu Station (Japanese)

Railway stations in Hokkaido Prefecture
Railway stations in Japan opened in 1959
Railway stations closed in 2021